The State of Alabama is divided into 67 counties. All counties are further subdivided into census county divisions (CCD). A CCD is a relatively permanent statistical area delineated cooperatively by the Census Bureau and state and local government authorities. CCDs are defined in states that do not have well-defined and stable minor civil divisions (e.g., townships) that have local governmental purposes. Within Alabama are 390 census county divisions.

A
 Abbeville
 Abernant
 Addison
 Alabaster-Helena
 Alberta
 Albertville-Boaz
 Alexander City
 Altoona
 Andalusia
 Anniston
 Arab
 Arsenal
 Ashland
 Ashville
 Athens
 Atmore
 Auburn-Opelika
 Autaugaville

B
 Baileyton-Joppa
 Bakerhill
 Banks-Josie
 Bay Minette
 Bayou La Batre
 Bear Creek
 Beatrice
 Beauregard-Marvyn
 Bellwood-Coffee Springs
 Belmont
 Benton-Collirene
 Berry
 Beulah
 Bexar
 Big Sandy-Duncanville
 Billingsley
 Birmingham
 Blountsville
 Boligee
 Braggs-Prairie Hill
 Brantley
 Bremen
 Brewton
 Bridgeport
 Brilliant
 Brookside
 Brooksville
 Brookwood
 Brundidge
 Butler

C
 Calera
 Camden
 Camp Hill
 Carbon Hill
 Carlowville
 Carrollton
 Castleberry
 Cedar Bluff-Gaylesville
 Centre
 Centreville-Brent
 Chapman
 Chatom
 Chelsea
 Cherokee
 Childersburg
 Choccolocco
 Citronelle
 Clanton
 Clarence
 Clay
 Clayton
 Cleveland
 Clio
 Cloverdale
 Coaling-Vance
 Coffeeville
 Coker
 Collinsville
 Columbia
 Columbiana
 Concord-Hopkins, also known as the Concord-Rock Creek Division
 Cordova
 Cottonton-Seale
 Cottonwood
 Coy-Fatama
 Craig-Tyler
 Crane Hill
 Crawford
 Crossville
 Cuba
 Cullman

D
 Dadeville
 Daleville
 Danville
 Daphne
 Deatsville
 Decatur
 Demopolis
 Dixons Mills
 Dora
 Dothan
 Double Springs
 Douglas

E
 East Escambia
 Echo
 Eclectic
 Elba
 Elberta
 Elmore
 Elrod-Moores Bridge-Echola
 Empire
 Enterprise
 Ethelsville
 Eufaula
 Eutaw
 Eva
 Evergreen

F
 Fairhope
 Falco
 Falkville
 Faunsdale
 Fayette
 Fitzpatrick
 Five Points
 Flat Creek-Wegra, also known as the Quinton-Wegra Division
 Flomaton
 Florala
 Florence
 Foley
 Folsom
 Forest Home
 Forkland-Tishabee
 Fort Davis
 Fort Deposit
 Fort Payne
 Fort Rucker
 Fosters
 Frisco City
 Fruitdale
 Fruithurst
 Fulton
 Fyffe

G
 Gadsden
 Gainesville
 Gardendale
 Geneva
 Georgiana-McKenzie
 Geraldine
 Gilbertown-Toxey
 Goodman
 Goodwater-Kellyton
 Gordo
 Goshen-Shady Grove
 Grand Bay
 Grant
 Graysville-Adamsville
 Greensboro
 Greenville
 Greenwood
 Grove Hill
 Guin
 Guntersville
 Gurley

H
 Hackleburg
 Haleburg
 Haleyville
 Hamburg
 Hamilton
 Hanceville
 Hartford
 Hartselle
 Hatton
 Hayden
 Hayneville
 Hazel Green
 Headland-Newville
 Heflin
 Heiberger
 Henagar
 Henderson-Spring Hill
 Hillsboro
 Hokes Bluff
 Holly Pond
 Hoover
 Hope Hull
 Huntsville
 Hurtsboro

I
 Ider
 Inverness
 Isabella-Pletcher

J
 Jack
 Jackson Northwest, also known as the Jackson Division
 Jackson Southeast, also known as the Walker Springs Division
 Jacksonville
 Jasper
 Jemison
 Jones Chapel

K
 Killen
 Kimberly-Morris
 Kinston

L
 La Fayette
 Laceys Spring
 Lanett
 Langdale
 Leeds
 Leesburg
 Leighton
 Lexington
 Lincoln
 Linden
 Lineville
 Lisman
 Little Texas-Society Hill
 Littleville
 Livingston
 Loachapoka-Roxana
 Locust Fork
 Logan
 Long Island
 Lookout Mountain
 Louisville
 Lowndesboro
 Luverne
 Lyeffion
 Lynn

M
 Madison
 Madison Crossroads
 Madrid
 Manchester
 Mantua-West Greene
 Maplesville
 Marbury
 Marion
 Maytown-Sylvan Springs
 McCullough-Huxford
 McIntosh
 Midway
 Millerville-Hollins
 Millport
 Millry
 Milltown
 Mineral Springs
 Mobile
 Monroeville
 Montevallo
 Montgomery
 Moody
 Mooresville
 Morris Chapel
 Moulton
 Moundville
 Mount Herman Valley, also known as the Greensboro Northeast Division
 Mount Hope
 Mount Meigs
 Mount Vernon
 Mountainboro
 Mud Creek, also known as the Spring Garden Division
 Munford

N
 Nauvoo
 Needmore
 New Hope
 New Market
 New Site
 Newton-Midland City
 North Johns
 North River, also known as the Northeast Fayette Division
 Northport
 Notasulga

O
 Oakland
 Oakman
 Ohatchee
 Oneonta
 Opp
 Orrville
 Ozark

P
 Paint Rock
 Palmerdale
 Panola-Geiger
 Parrish
 Pell City
 Peterman
 Petrey-Highland Home
 Phenix City
 Phil Campbell
 Piedmont
 Pike Road
 Pine Apple
 Pine Hill
 Pine Level
 Piper-Coleanor
 Pisgah
 Prairie Eden-Newbern
 Prattville
 Princeton

R
 Ragland
 Rainsville-Sylvania
 Ramer
 Ranburne
 Red Bay
 Reform
 Renfroe-Laniers
 Repton
 River Bend, also known as the Greensboro South Division
 Roanoke
 Robbins Crossroads
 Robertsdale
 Rockford
 Rogersville
 Rosehill-Gantt
 Russell, also known as the Winfield-Glen Allen Division
 Russellville

S
 Safford
 Salem
 Samantha
 Samson
 Sardis
 Sawyerville
 Scottsboro
 Section
 Selma
 Semmes
 Shorter-Hardaway
 Shorterville
 Shreve
 Silas
 Simcoe
 Sipsey
 Slocomb
 Smiths-Salem
 Somerville
 South Pickens, also known as the Aliceville Division
 Speake-Oakville
 Springville
 Sprott
 Stevenson
 Stewart-Akron
 Stockton
 Sulligent
 Summerdale
 Sweet Water
 Sycamore-Winterboro
 Sylacauga

T
 Talladega
 Tallassee
 Tanner Williams
 Theodore
 Thomaston
 Thomasville
 Titus
 Town Creek
 Town Creek-Courtland
 Townley
 Triana, also known as Triana-Blackwall Division
 Tri-Cities
 Troy
 Trussville
 Turkeytown
 Tuscaloosa
 Tuskegee-Milstead

U
 Union Grove
 Union Springs
 Uniontown
 Uriah

V
 Valley Head-Mentone
 Verbena
 Vernon
 Victoria
 Vina
 Vincent
 Vinemont
 Vredenburgh

W
 Wadley
 Wagarville
 Warrior
 Warrior-Creek Stand
 Waterloo
 Waverly
 Websters Chapel-Alexandria Valley
 Wedowee
 Welti
 Weogufka-Marble Valley
 West Blocton
 West Jefferson
 Wetumpka
 Wills Valley
 Wilsonville
 Windham Springs
 Winfield
 Woodland

Y
 York

References
Alabama American Indian Areas, Counties, Independent Cities, County Subdivisions, and Other Places from the Census Bureau's State/County Subdivision Outline Maps (PDF)

Census county divisions
Alabama
Lists of populated places in Alabama